Aspire Park is located in Aspire Zone, in the southern district of Baaya in Doha, Qatar. It covers an area of 88 hectares and it is Doha's biggest park. It is a great place to have picnics and family outdoors while overlooking the Aspire Tower, especially at night. The park has different features such as beautiful fountains, playgrounds for children, and other fun features. It has the only lake in Qatar, a small hill, a coffee shop where different kinds of beverages can be bought, and various kinds of trees, both rare and common. Located close by is the Aspire Tower, a 300-meter modern hotel, which served as a giant torch for the 15th Asian Games. On March 23, 2020, The ministry of Commerce and Industry has closed the Aspire Park, along other parks, due to the COVID-19 outbreak until further notice. It has been since reopened.

Art installations
Perceval by British artist Sarah Lucas is a life-sized bronze sculpture of a Shire horse pulling a cart with two oversized squash installed at the Aspire Park. The subject matter reflects Lucas' fondness for re-examining everyday objects in unusual contexts.

Gallery

See also
Villagio Mall
Aspire Dome
Aspire Academy
Aspire lake

References

External links
Qatar Visitor
Qatar Explorer
Qatar Living

Doha
Parks in Qatar
Urban public parks